Jan-Harm Pol (born September 4, 1942) is a Dutch-American veterinarian who stars on the reality television show The Incredible Dr. Pol on Nat Geo Wild.

Early life and career 
Jan-Harm Pol was born on September 4, 1942, in Wateren, Drenthe, in the Netherlands. Pol grew up on his family's dairy farm. Pol met his wife, Diane Dalrymple, who was a foreign exchange student at Mayville High School in 1961.

In 1970, Pol graduated with a degree in veterinary medicine at Utrecht University. Pol and his wife moved to Harbor Beach, Michigan, where Pol worked for a veterinarian practice for 10 years. He moved to Weidman, Michigan, where he started Pol Veterinary Services in 1981. Pol Veterinary Service treats animals from surrounding neighborhoods due to the lack of veterinary services in rural Michigan.

In 2013, Pol testified before the Michigan House of Representatives in favor of a bill to prohibit authorities from investigating reports of misconduct or allegations based upon information obtained from viewing the broadcast of a reality program but the bill died in committee.

Pol was fined $500 in 2014 and had his license put on probation by the Michigan Board of Veterinary Medicine for not wearing proper surgical attire during treatment of a Boston terrier. A year later, the sentencing was overturned by the Michigan Court of Appeals, which reversed and remanded, holding inter alia that there was no competent evidence that there was a breach of the standard of care.

In 2013, Pol received an honorary doctorate of public service from Central Michigan University.

Personal life 
Pol is married to Diane Pol and has three children, Kathy, Charles and Diane, Jr. All of the Pol children are adopted. The Pols adopted Diane at age 17, after she had been the Pol's' foster child for eight years.

Pol is color blind.

References

External links 

 
 

1942 births
American veterinarians
Male veterinarians
Dutch emigrants to the United States
Dutch veterinarians
Living people
People from Isabella County, Michigan
People from Westerveld
Utrecht University alumni